Casimiro "Jun" Alcantara Ynares III (born March 4, 1973) is a Filipino physician and politician who is the mayor of Antipolo from 2013 to 2019 and since 2022. He previously served as the Public Information Officer of the city under his wife, former Mayor Andrea Bautista-Ynares, and the governor of Rizal from 2007 to 2013.

Ynares is the son of former governors Casimiro Ynares Jr. and Rebecca Ynares. He is the brother of Governor Nina Ricci Ynares.

He is married to Andrea Bautista-Ynares, who also became mayor of Antipolo, daughter of former senator Ramon Revilla Sr., and sister of actor and incumbent senator Bong Revilla. They have three children: Audrey Ann (deceased), Cassandra Danielle, and Rebecca Victoria.

References

21st-century Filipino politicians
Mayors of places in Rizal
Governors of Rizal
1973 births
Living people
Filipino medical doctors
Mayors of Antipolo